Horned blenny is the common name of several fish. It may refer to:

Parablennius cornutus
Parablennius intermedius

Fish common names